Crotone drimydis is a species of fungi in the family Venturiaceae.

References

External links

Venturiaceae
Taxa named by Joseph-Henri Léveillé